The Government of Rotterdam is the government of the municipality and city of Rotterdam in the Netherlands. Most of the inhabitants live in the city of Rotterdam, but the municipality also covers a number of small villages, and other parts of the local government, such as Rozenburg, cover an even larger area.

City council 

Results of the elections of 2002, 2006, 2010, 2014, 2018, and 2022:

¹ In 2022 only CU.

City executive

City executive 2002 - 2006 
Pim Fortuyn of Leefbaar Rotterdam (right-wing populistic) won the elections on 6 March 2002 with 17 seats and formed a new coalition with the CDA (Christian democratic) and VVD (liberal) that unseated the PvdA (labour) which had ruled Rotterdam for decades. Only three months to the day later he was assassiated.

City executive 2006 - 2010 
The coalition mayor and aldermen for the period 2006-2010 was formed by a coalition of the parties PvdA (labour), CDA (Christian democratic), VVD (liberal) and GroenLinks (green left). The college was sworn in on May 18, 2006.

The college since its inauguration in 2006 had a number of cycles. VVD alderman Roelf de Boer retreated from his position in 2007. In 2008, GreenLeft alderman Orhan Kaya was replaced by Rik Grashoff. In April 2009 VVD left the coalition, though it retained a slim majority of 23 of the 45 seats. The two VVD aldermen Jeannette Baljeu and Mark Harbers were replaced by CDA and PvdA aldermen. This left the CDA with three council seats and three aldermen, a remarkable situation. In July 2009 CDA alderman Leonard Geluk joined the coalition but he stepped down prematurely, because of his new position as chairman of ROC Netherlands.

City executive 2010 - 2014 
The city board of mayor and aldermen was formed by four parties: PvdA (labour), VVD (conservative-liberal), D66 (social-liberal), and CDA (christian-democratic).

Aldermen were: Jeannette Baljeu, Hugo de Jonge, Hamit Karakus, Jantine Kriens, Antoinette Laan and Korrie Louwes (Dominic Schrijer resigned on May 17, 2011).

City executive 2014 - 2018 
The city board of mayor and aldermen was formed by three parties: Leefbaar Rotterdam (right-wing populistic), D66 (social-liberal), and CDA (christian-democratic).

Aldermen were: Joost Eerdmans, Hugo de Jonge, Pex Langenberg, Ronald Schneider, Maarten Struijvenberg and Adriaan Visser.

City executive 2018 - 2022 
The city board of mayor and aldermen was formed by seven parties: VVD (conservative liberal), D66 (social liberal), GL (green left), PvdA (social democratic), CDA (Christian democratic), and CU-SGP (conservative Christian).

Alder(wo)men were:
 Judith Bokhove (GL)
 Arno Bonte (GL)
 Christine Eskes (CDA) - replacement of Sven de Langen
 Arjan van Gils (D66)
 Michiel Grauss (CU-SGP)
 Vincent Karremans (VVD) - replacement of Bert Wijbenga
 Said Kasmi (D66)
 Bas Kurvers (VVD)
 Richard Moti (PvdA)
 Roos Vermeij (PvdA) - replacement of Barbara Kathmann

City executive 2022 - 2026 
In 2022, Leefbaar Rotterdam (right-wing populistic) have again won the elections and have formed a coalition with VVD (conservative liberal), D66 (social liberal) and DENK (multicultural).

Mayors

The mayor (of Rotterdam) is part of the city executive and chairs the city council. Current mayor is Ahmed Aboutaleb (PvdA).

Mayors since World War II:
 Pieter Oud            (1945–1952)
 Gerard van Walsum     (1952–1965)
 Wim Thomassen         (1965–1974)
 André van der Louw    (1974–1981)
 Bram Peper            (1982–1998)
 Ivo Opstelten         (1999–2009)
 Ahmed Aboutaleb       (2009–present)

Boroughs

Until 19 March 2014, Rotterdam's fourteen boroughs had the formal status of submunicipalities (deelgemeenten) under the Dutch Municipalities Act. The submunicipalities were responsible for many activities that previously had been run by the central city. The idea was to bring the government closer to the people. All submunicipalities had their own deelgemeenteraad ('submunicipal council'), direct elected by the borough's inhabitants. The district councils enjoyed far-reaching autonomous decisionmaking powers in many policy areas. Only affairs pertaining the whole city such as major infrastructural projects remained within the jurisdiction of by the central municipal council.

In 2014, the submunicipalities were abolished by law, but Rotterdam maintained its boroughs. The district councils were replaced with smaller, but still directly elected gebiedscommissies ('area committees'). The area committees no longer have autonomous powers, but instead act primarily as advisory and participatory bodies for the central municipal council.

The fourteen boroughs of Rotterdam are:

The port areas are governed directly by the central municipality.

Annexations and reclassifications 
The city of Rotterdam was especially strong growth since 1850. Initially they tried to accommodate the population within existing municipal boundaries, but this soon proved inadequate. Therefore, sequentially neighboring municipalities annexed or she had to cede territory to Rotterdam. An overview of these annexations and reclassifications:
 1816 municipality Cool annexed.
 1870 won territory of the municipalities Charlois, IJsselmonde and Katendrecht* serving ports and urban expansion on the current Kop van Zuid.
 1886: annexation of the town Delfshaven (13,651 inhabitants)
 1895: annexation of municipalities Charlois (12,154 inhabitants) and Kralingen (21,132 inhabitants), also won territory of the municipalities IJsselmonde and Overschie
 1903 won territory of the municipality Overschie
 1904 won territory of the municipality Hillegersberg
 1909 won territory of the municipality of Schiedam
 1914 won territory of the municipalities 's-Gravenzande (Hook of Holland village, population 2964), Naaldwijk and Rozenburg
 1926 won territory of the municipality of Schiedam
 1934: annexation of municipalities Hoogvliet (1331 inhabitants) and Pernis** (4988 inhabitants), also won territory of the municipalities Poortugaal, Rhoon and Schiedam
 1939 won territory of the municipalities 's-Gravenzande and Naaldwijk
 1940 won territory of the municipalities Schiedam and Overschie
 1941: annexation of municipalities Hillegersberg (25,638 inhabitants), IJsselmonde (9183 inhabitants), Overschie (11,639 inhabitants) and Schiebroek (8030 inhabitants), also territories from the municipalities of Barendrecht, Berkel en Rodenrijs, Capelle aan den IJssel, Kethel en Spaland (both annexed by Schiedam), Rozenburg, Schiedam and Vlaardingen
 1953 won and lost territory to the municipality of Schiedam
 1966 won territory of the municipalities of Geervliet, Heenvliet, Rozenburg, Spijkenisse and Zwartewaal serving the Europoort
 1972 won and lost territory to the municipality Oostvoorne and won territory of the State (North) serving the Maasvlakte
 1976 won and lost territory to the municipality Rhoon
 1978 won and lost territory to the municipality Capelle aan den IJssel and territory from the municipality of Zevenhuizen
 1980 won territory of the municipalities of Brielle, Rozenburg and Oostvoorne
 1985 won territory of the municipalities and Poortugaal, Rozenburg (new housing east of Hoogvliet, 17,032 inhabitants) and lost to the municipality Albrandswaard (which was recorded simultaneously Poortugaal)
 1995 won territory of the municipalities of Nieuwerkerk aan den IJssel and Zevenhuizen-Moerkapelle serving the Vinex Nesselande district, also lost territory to Ridderkerk
 1997 won territory of the municipality of Capelle aan den IJssel
 2001 won and lost territory to the municipality Capelle aan den IJssel
 2010: annexation of the town Rozenburg (ca. 12,500 inhabitants).

* The municipality Katendrecht in 1873 annexed by the municipality Charlois

** The city annexed Pernis in 1834 the town 's-Gravenambacht

International relations 
Rotterdam has the following city and port connections throughout the world:
 14 Sister Cities
 13 Partner Cities
 4 Sister Ports

Twin towns – sister cities
Rotterdam is twinned with:

  Cologne, Germany 1958
  Esch-sur-Alzette, Luxembourg 1958
  Lille, France 1958
  Turin, Italy 1958 
  Liège, Belgium 1958
  Burgas, Bulgaria 1976
  Constanța, Romania 1976
  Gdańsk, Poland 1977
  Shanghai, China 1979
  Havana, Cuba 1983
  Saint Petersburg, Russia 1966
  Baltimore, Maryland, USA 1985
  Las Palmas de Gran Canaria, Spain
  Dresden, Germany 1988 
  Istanbul, Turkey 2005
  Surabaya, Indonesia
  Szeged, Hungary
  Kuching, Malaysia

Partner cities

  Hull, United Kingdom 1936
  Antwerp, Belgium 1940
  Basel, Switzerland 1945
  Oslo, Norway 1945
  Duisburg, Germany 1950
  Nuremberg, Germany 1961
  Jakarta, Indonesia 1983
  Osaka, Japan 1984
  Budapest, Hungary 1991
  Bratislava, Slovakia 1991 
  Durban, South Africa 1991
  Prague, Czech Republic 1991
  Buenos Aires, Argentina 1990

Sister ports

References